Pachytychius haematocephalus, the gilkicker weevil, is a species of true weevil in the family of beetles known as Curculionidae. It is found in North America, and in the area from whence its name derives, Fort Gilkicker, in Gosport, Hampshire, UK.

References

Further reading

External links

 

Curculioninae
Articles created by Qbugbot
Beetles described in 1836